Bourscheid may refer to the following places:

 Bourscheid, Luxembourg
 Bourscheid Castle
 Bourscheid, Moselle, France

See also
Burscheid, Germany